The West Indies cricket team, nicknamed the, Men in Maroon or The Windies, is a multi-national men's cricket team representing the mainly English-speaking countries and territories in the Caribbean region and administered by Cricket West Indies. The players on this composite team are selected from a chain of fifteen Caribbean nation-states and territories. , the West Indies cricket team is ranked eighth in Tests, and tenth in ODIs and seventh in T20Is in the official ICC rankings.

From the mid-late 1970s to the early 1990s, the West Indies team was the strongest in the world in both Test and One Day International cricket. A number of cricketers who were considered among the best in the world have hailed from the West Indies: Garfield Sobers, Lance Gibbs, George Headley, Brian Lara, Vivian Richards, Clive Lloyd, Malcolm Marshall, Alvin Kallicharran, Andy Roberts, Rohan Kanhai, Frank Worrell, Clyde Walcott, Everton Weekes, Curtly Ambrose, Michael Holding, Courtney Walsh, Joel Garner, and Wes Hall have all been inducted into the ICC Cricket Hall of Fame.

The West Indies have won the ICC Cricket World Cup twice (1975 and 1979, when it was styled the Prudential Cup), the ICC T20 World Cup twice (2012 and 2016, when it was styled World Twenty20), the ICC Champions Trophy once (2004), the ICC Under 19 Cricket World Cup once (2016), and have also finished as runners-up in the Cricket World Cup (1983), the Under 19 Cricket World Cup (2004), and the ICC Champions Trophy (2006). The West Indies appeared in three consecutive World Cup finals (1975, 1979 and 1983), and were the first team to win back-to-back World Cups (1975 and 1979), both of these records have been surpassed only by Australia, who appeared in 4 consecutive World Cup Finals (1996, 1999, 2003 and 2007) winning 3 consecutive World Cups (1999, 2003 and 2007).

The West Indies have hosted the 2007 Cricket World Cup and the 2010 ICC World Twenty20.

Member states and dependencies
The current team represents:

 Sovereign states
 L
 
 W
 W
 
 
 
 L
 L
 W
 W
 
 Constituent country of the 
 L
 Overseas Territories of the 
 L
 L
 L
 Territory of the 
 L

 Note

Affiliates in Cricket West Indies

Cricket West Indies, the governing body of the team, consists of the six cricket associations of Barbados, Guyana, Jamaica, the Leeward Islands, Trinidad and Tobago, and the Windward Islands. The Leeward Islands Cricket Association consists of three cricket associations from two sovereign states (one from Antigua and Barbuda, and two from Saint Kitts and Nevis), three British Overseas Territories (Anguilla, the British Virgin Islands, and Montserrat), one U.S. territory (the U.S. Virgin Islands), and one Dutch constituent country (Sint Maarten). The Windward Islands Cricket Board of Control consists of associations of four sovereign states (Dominica, Grenada, Saint Lucia, and Saint Vincent and the Grenadines).

Two more British Overseas Territories in the region that have once been historical parts of the former West Indies Federation, the Cayman Islands and the Turks and Caicos Islands, have their own national teams currently.

National teams also exist for the various islands, which, as they are all separate countries, very much keep their local identities and support their local favourites. These national teams take part in the West Indian first-class competition, the Regional Four Day Competition (earlier known as the Busta Cup, Shell Shield, Carib Beer Cup, and various other names). It is also common for other international teams to play the island teams for warm-up games before they take on the combined West Indies team.

The combined population of these countries and territories is around 6 million people, comparable to fellow Full Members New Zealand and Ireland, and prominent Associate Member Scotland.

The member associations of Cricket West Indies are:

 Barbados Cricket Association (BCA)
 Guyana Cricket Board (GCB)
 Jamaica Cricket Association (JCA)
 Leeward Islands Cricket Association (LICA); itself composed of:
 Anguilla Cricket Association
 Antigua and Barbuda Cricket Association
 British Virgin Islands Cricket Association
 Montserrat Cricket Association
 Nevis Cricket Association (for the island of Nevis alone)
 Saint Kitts Cricket Association (for the island of Saint Kitts alone)
 Sint Maarten Cricket Association
 United States Virgin Islands Cricket Association
 Trinidad and Tobago Cricket Board (TTCB)
 Windward Islands Cricket Board of Control (WICBC); itself composed of:
 Dominica Cricket Association
 Grenada Cricket Association
 Saint Lucia Cricket Association
 Saint Vincent and the Grenadines Cricket Association

Potential future members
 Bahamas
 Overseas collectivities of France
 Saint BarthélemyL
 Saint MartinL
 Overseas regions of the French Republic
 GuadeloupeL
 MartiniqueW
 Special municipalities of the Netherlands
 SabaL
 Sint EustatiusL

History

The history of the West Indies cricket team began in the 1890s, when the first representative sides were selected to play visiting English sides. The WICB joined the sport's international ruling body, the Imperial Cricket Conference, in 1926, and played their first official international match, granted Test status, in 1928, thus becoming the fourth Test 'nation'. In their early days in the 1930s, the side represented the British colonies that would later form the West Indies Federation plus British Guiana.

The last series the West Indies played before the outbreak of the Second World War was against England in 1939. There followed a hiatus that lasted until January 1948 when the MCC toured the West Indies. Of the West Indies players in that first match after the war only Gerry Gomez, George Headley, Jeffrey Stollmeyer, and Foffie Williams had previously played Test cricket. In 1948, leg spinner Wilfred Ferguson became the first West Indian bowler to take ten wickets in a Test, finishing with 11/229 in a match against England; later that same year Hines Johnson became the first West Indies fast bowler to achieve the feat, managing 10/96 against the same opponents.

The West Indies defeated England for the first time at Lord's on 29 June 1950. Ramadhin and Alf Valentine were the architects of the victory which inspired a calypso by Lord Beginner. Later on 16 August 1950, completed a 3–1 series win when they won at The Oval. Although blessed with some great players in their early days as a Test team, their successes remained sporadic until the 1960s when the side changed from a white-dominated to a black-dominated side under the successive captaincies of Frank Worrell and Gary Sobers.

By the late 1970s, the West Indies led by Clive Lloyd had a side recognised as unofficial world champions, a reputation they retained throughout the 1980s. During these glory years, the West Indies were noted for their four-man fast bowling attack, backed up by some of the best batsmen in the world. In 1976, fast bowler Michael Holding took 14/149 in the OvalTest against England, setting a record which still stands for best bowling figures in a Test by a West Indies bowler. The 1980s saw the team set a then-record streak of 11 consecutive Test victories in 1984 and inflict two 5–0 "blackwashes" on England.

Throughout the 1990s and 2000s, however, West Indian cricket declined, largely owing to the failure of the West Indian Cricket Board to move the game from an amateur pastime to a professional sport, coupled with the general economic decline in West Indian countries, and the team struggling to retain its past glory. Victory in the 2004 Champions Trophy and a runner-up showing in the 2006 Champions Trophy left some hopeful, but it was not until the inception of Twenty20 cricket that the West Indies began to regain a place among the cricketing elite and among cricket fans, as they developed ranks of players capable of taking over games with their power hitting, including Chris Gayle, Kieron Pollard, Marlon Samuels, Lendl Simmons, DJ Bravo, Andre Russell and Carlos Brathwaite. They beat Australia and then host Sri Lanka in the 2012 World Twenty20 to win their first ICC world championship since the 1979 World Cup and then bested England to win the 2016 World Twenty20, making them the first team to win the World Twenty20 twice. As an added bonus, the West Indies also became the first to win both the men's and women's World Twenty20 on the same day, as the women's team beat three-time defending champion Australia for their first ICC world title immediately beforehand.

Flag and anthem

Most cricketing nations use their own national flags for cricketing purposes. However, as the West Indies represent a number of independent states and dependencies, there is no natural choice of flag. The WICB has, therefore, developed an insignia showing a palm tree and cricket stumps on a small sunny island (see the top of this article). The insignia, on a maroon background, makes up the West Indian flag. The background sometimes has a white stripe above a green stripe, which is separated by a maroon stripe, passing horizontally through the middle of the background. Prior to 1999, the WICB(C) had used a similar insignia featuring a cabbage palm tree and an island, but there were no stumps and, instead of the sun, there was the constellation Orion. It was designed in 1923 by Sir Algernon Aspinall, then Secretary of the West India Committee. Around the same time in the 1920s the suggested motto for the West Indies team was "Nec curat Orion leones", which comes from a quote by Horace, meaning that Orion, as symbolical of the West Indies XI, does not worry about the lions [of English cricket].

For ICC tournaments, "Rally 'Round the West Indies"  by David Rudder is used as the team's anthem.

Venues

The following eleven stadiums have been used for at least one Test match. The number of Tests played at each venue followed by the number of One Day Internationals and twenty20 internationals played at that venue is in brackets as of 2 April 2021:

Queen's Park Oval – Port of Spain, Trinidad (61/73/6): The Queen's Park Oval has hosted more Test matches than any other ground in the Caribbean and first hosted a Test match in 1930. The ground is considered one of the most picturesque venues in the world of cricket, featuring the view Trinidad's Northern Range. It has a capacity of over 18,000.
Kensington Oval – Bridgetown, Barbados (55/44/23):Kensington Oval hosted the region's first Test match in 1930 and is recognised as the 'Mecca' of West Indies cricket. Its capacity was increased from 15,000 to 28,000 for the 2007 World Cup and down to its current capacity of 11,000 post – World Cup. It has hosted two ICC world finals – the 2007 Cricket World Cup Final, which Australia won over Sri Lanka, and the 2010 World Twenty20 Final, which England won against Australia.
Bourda – Georgetown, Guyana (30/11/0): Bourda first hosted a Test match in 1930. It was the only Test ground in South America (until the use of Providence), and the only one below sea level and with its own moat (to prevent the pitch from frequent flooding). It has a capacity of around 22,000. It is remembered for the Pitch Invasion during an April 1999, One Day International between Australia and the West Indies, with Australia needing 3 runs to tie and 4 to win off the last ball, a full scale pitch invasion, resulted in the match being deemed a tie, due to the stumps having been stolen before the West Indian team could effect a run out.
Sabina Park – Kingston, Jamaica (54/41/6): Sabina Park first hosted a Test match in 1930. The Blue Mountains, which are famed for their coffee, form the backdrop. Sabina Park played host to Garry Sobers' then world-record 365 not out. In 1998, the Test against England was abandoned here on the opening day because the pitch was too dangerous. It has a capacity of 15,000.
Antigua Recreation Ground – St John's, Antigua (22/11/0): Antigua Recreation Ground first hosted a Test in 1981. Three Test triple centuries have been scored on this ground: Chris Gayle's 317 in 2005, and Brian Lara's world record scores of 375 in 1994 and 400 not out in 2004. The historic stadium was removed from the roster of grounds hosting international matches in June 2006, to make way for the island's new cricket stadium, being constructed 3 miles outside the capital city expected to be completed in time for its hosting of matches for Cricket World Cup 2007. However, after the abandoned Test match between England and the West Indies in February 2009 at the new North Sound ground, Test cricket returned to the ARG.
Arnos Vale – Arnos Vale, Kingstown, St Vincent (3/23/2): The Arnos Vale Ground a.k.a. The Playing Fields first hosted a Test in 1997.
National Cricket Stadium – St George's, Grenada (4/25/6): Queen's Park, Grenada first hosted a Test in 2002.
Darren Sammy National Cricket Stadium – Gros Islet, St Lucia (10/26/17): Originally the Beauséjour Cricket Ground, first hosted a Test in 2003. It has a capacity of 12,000. This was the first stadium in the Caribbean to host a day-night cricket match. The match was between the West Indies and Zimbabwe. New Zealand was scheduled to play a test in 2014 to mark the return to Test cricket after a break of 8 years. Following the West Indies' victory in the 2016 World Twenty20, the St. Lucian government renamed the venue after captain Sammy, a native St. Lucian, with another St. Lucian – Johnson Charles – having a stand named in his honor after also being part of the 2012 and 2016 championship squads.
Warner Park Stadium – Basseterre, St Kitts (3/18/10): The Warner Park Sporting Complex hosted its first One Day International on 23 May 2006 and its first Test match on 22 June 2006. The stadium has a permanent capacity of 8,000, with provisions for temporary stands to enable the hosting figure to past 10,000.
Providence Stadium – Georgetown, Guyana (2/24/8): The Providence Stadium hosted its first One Day International on 28 March 2007 for the 2007 Cricket World Cup and its first Test match on 22 March 2008. The stadium has a permanent capacity of 15,000, and is to host Test cricket instead of Bourda.
Sir Vivian Richards Stadium – North Sound, Antigua (12/20/4): The Sir Viv Richards Stadium hosted its first One Day International on 27 March 2007 for the 2007 Cricket World Cup and its first Test match on 30 May 2008. The stadium has a permanent capacity of 10,000, and is to host Test cricket instead of the Antigua Recreation Ground.
Windsor Park Stadium – Roseau, Dominica (5/4/4): Windsor Park is another home venue for the West Indian team. Construction first started on it in 2005, and it finally opened in October 2007, too late to serve as a venue for the 2007 Cricket World Cup. It hosts first-class cricket and hosted its first test on 6 July 2011 against India, however it held its first One Day International on 26 July 2009. It has a seating capacity of 12,000.

Three further stadia have been used for One Day Internationals, or Twenty20 Internationals but not Test matches. The number of One Day Internationals and Twenty20 Internationals played at each venue is shown in the table below:

ODI and T20I grounds

Clothing

When playing one-day cricket, the Windies wear a maroon-coloured shirt and trousers. The shirt also sports the logo of the West Indian Cricket Board and the name of their suppliers Castore on the sleeves of their jerseys. The one-day cap is maroon with the WICB logo on the left of the front, with two yellow stripes.

When playing first-class cricket, in addition to their cricket flannels West Indian fielders sometimes wear a maroon sunhat with a wide brim or a maroon baggy cap. The WICB logo is on the front of the hat. Helmets are coloured similarly. The sweater was edged with Maroon, green and grey. Gold was added to the stripes in the early 2000s. The design reverted to a simple maroon facing when the West Indies began wearing fleeces. In 2020 they again wore the traditional cable knit sweaters edged with Maroon and Green. When the team toured they wore maroon caps but in test matches in the Caribbean, it was customary for the team to wear dark blue caps until the late 1970s. The blazers awarded for home tests were dark blue with white and green facings. An example is displayed in the museum at Lord's. After c 1977 home and away teams both wore maroon caps and the blazers were the same colours.

During World Series Cricket, coloured uniforms were adopted. The initial West Indies uniform was pink and was later changed to maroon to match their Test match caps. Grey was also added as a secondary colour. In some of their uniforms grey has been dominant over the traditional maroon. Some uniforms had green, yellow or white as accent colour.

Former sponsors were Sandals  (2018-2021) Digicel (2005-2018), KFC (2006-2009), Cable & Wireless (2000-2004), Carib Beer (1999-2001) and Kingfisher (1996-1999).

West Indies women's cricket team

The West Indies women's cricket team enjoy a much lower profile than the men's team. They played 11 Test matches between 1975–76 and 1979, winning once, losing three times, and drawing the other games. Since then, they have only played one further Test match, a draw game against Pakistan in 2003–04. They also have an infrequent record in One Day Internationals. A team from Trinidad and Tobago and a team from Jamaica played in the first women's World Cup in 1973, with both sides faring poorly, finishing fifth and sixth respectively out of a field of seven. The Windies united as a team to play their first ODI in 1979, but thereafter did not play until the 1993 World Cup. The side has never been one of the leading sides in the world, however, since the 2013 World Cup, where the team finished runner-ups, the team has improved reasonably well. Their main success being achieving second place in the International Women's Cricket Council Trophy, a competition for the second tier of women's national cricket teams, in 2003. Their overall record in one-dayers is to have played 177, won 80, lost 91 with one tie and 5 no results .

Because of the women's side's relatively low profile, there are few well-known names in the game. The most notable is probably Nadine George, a wicket-keeper/batsman, who became the first, and to date only, West Indian woman to score a Test century, in Karachi, Pakistan in 2003–04. George is a prominent supporter of sport in the West Indies, and in particular, in her native St Lucia, and in 2005 was made an MBE by the Prince of Wales for services to sport.

2016 saw the West Indies women win their first ICC world championship – the 2016 Women's World Twenty20, after beating three-time defending champion Australia by eight wickets at Eden Gardens with members of the men's team in the crowd to support.

Tournament history

A red box around the year indicates tournaments played within West Indies

ICC World Test Championship

Cricket World Cup

ICC Trophy/ICC Cricket World Cup Qualifier

1979-2014: Not eligible (top 8 in ODI rankings and Full Member of ICC)
2018: Runner-up (qualified for the ICC Cricket World Cup 2019)

ICC T20 World Cup

ICC Champions Trophy
Known as the 'ICC Knockout' in 1998 and 2000.

Honours
World Cup:
 Champions (2): 1975, 1979
 Runners-up (1): 1983
T20 World Cup:
 Champions (2): 2012, 2016
Champions Trophy:
 Champions (1): 2004
 Runners-up (2): 1998, 2006

Statistics and records

 Innings totals above 700
For: 790 for 3 declared against Pakistan in Kingston in 1957–58; 751 for 5 declared against England in St John's in 2003–04; 747 all out against South Africa in St John's in 2004–05; 749 for 9 declared against England in Bridgetown in 2008–2009
Against: 849 by England in Kingston in 1929–30; 758 for 8 declared by Australia in Kingston in 1954–55

 Innings totals below 60
For: 47 against England in Kingston in 2003–04; 51 against Australia in Port of Spain in 1998–99; 53 against Pakistan in Faisalabad in 1986–87; 54 against England at Lord's in 2000; 60 against Pakistan in Karachi in 2017-18 (60/9 (Surrender)) 
Against: 46 by England in Port of Spain in 1993–94; 51 by England in Kingston in 2008–09

 Triple centuries scored for the Windies
400 not out by Brian Lara against England at St John's in 2003–04; 375 by Brian Lara against England at St John's in 1993–94; 365 not out by Garry Sobers against Pakistan at Kingston in 1957–58; 333 by Chris Gayle against Sri Lanka at Galle in 2010–11; 317 by Chris Gayle against South Africa at St John's in 2004–05; 302 by Lawrence Rowe against England at Bridgetown in 1973–74

 Twelve or more wickets were taken for the Windies in a Test match
14 for the cost of 149 runs by Michael Holding against England at the Oval in 1976; 13 for 55 by Courtney Walshagainst New Zealand in Wellington in 1994–95; Shanon Gabriel took 13 for 121 against Sri Lanka.:12 for 121 by Andy Roberts against India in Madras in 1974–

 Hat-tricks
Wes Hall against Pakistan in 1959; Lance Gibbs against Australia in 1961; Courtney Walsh against Australia in 1988; and Jermaine Lawson against Australia in 2003

One-day matches

 Hat-trick
An ODI hat-trick performance was made by Jerome Taylor on 19 October 2006 at Mumbai in an ICC Champions Trophy league match against Australia

At the ICC 2011 Cricket World Cup, Kemar Roach became the sixth bowler to claim a World Cup hat-trick against the Netherlands

Test captains

The following men have captained the West Indian cricket team in at least one Test match:

Current squad
This lists all active players who were named most recent Test, ODI or T20I squads or has an international retainer contract with Cricket West Indies. Contracted players are listed in Bold.
Updated: 23 January 2023

Forms - This refers to the forms they've played for West Indies in the past year, not over their whole West Indies career
S/N – Shirt number

Note - Nicholas Pooran was the ODI & T20I Captain in the most recent series, but has resigned from captaincy since then.

Coaching staff

Coaching history
1992–1995:  Rohan Kanhai
1995–1996:  Andy Roberts
1996–1999:  Malcolm Marshall
1999:  Viv Richards (interim)
2000–2003:  Roger Harper
2003–2004:  Gus Logie
2004–2007:  Bennett King
2007:  David Moore (interim)
2007–2009:  John Dyson
2009–2010:  David Williams (interim)
2010–2014:  Ottis Gibson
2015–2016:  Phil Simmons
2017–2018:  Stuart Law
2018:  Nic Pothas (interim)
2019:  Richard Pybus (interim)
2019:  Floyd Reifer (interim)
2019–2022:  Phil Simmons
2022–present:  Andre Coley (interim)

In popular culture
A British documentary film titled Fire in Babylon released in 2010. The documentary featured archival footage and interviews with several cricketers. The film was written and directed by Stevan Riley and was nominated for a British Independent Film Award for Best Documentary.

The documentary was about the domination of West Indies team of 1970s and 1980s, widely regarded as one of the greatest cricket teams in the history having not lost a test series for 15 years. It revolves around how the West Indies triumphed over its former colonial masters of England and racism in those days against Black peoples.

See also

Cricket in the West Indies
Cricket West Indies
Fire in Babylon
History of the West Indian cricket team
List of West Indies Test cricket records
West Indies A cricket team
West Indies High Performance Centre
West Indies women's cricket team

References

Further reading
 "West Indies home summer series", the West Indies cricket team's 2021 home series.

External links

Official Facebook page of the West Indies Cricket team
Official Cricket West Indies website

Cricket in the West Indies
Multinational sports teams
National cricket teams
Cricket
C